Grintovec is a settlement on the right bank of the Krka River in the Municipality of Ivančna Gorica in central Slovenia. The area is part of the historical region of Lower Carniola. The municipality is now included in the Central Slovenia Statistical Region. 

A small roadside chapel-shrine in the settlement is dedicated to the Virgin Mary and was built in the 19th century.

References

External links

Grintovec on Geopedia

Populated places in the Municipality of Ivančna Gorica